The GBU-10 Paveway II is an American Paveway-series laser-guided bomb, based on the Mk 84 general-purpose bomb, but with laser seeker and wings for guidance. Introduced into service c. 1976. Used by USAF, US Navy, US Marine Corps, Royal Australian Air Force and various NATO air forces.

Description

The GBU-10 has been built in more than a half-dozen variants with different wing and fuse combinations.
GBU-10 bombs (along with the balance of the Paveway series) are produced by defense contractors Lockheed Martin and Raytheon.  Raytheon began production after purchasing the product line from Texas Instruments. Lockheed Martin was awarded a contract to compete with Raytheon when there was a break in production caused by transferring manufacturing out of Texas.

Raytheon production of the Paveway II is centered in Arizona, Texas, and New Mexico.  Lockheed Martin production is centered in Pennsylvania.

Laser-guided bombs are often labeled as "smart bombs", despite requiring external input in the form of laser designation of the intended target.

On 14 February 1991, an air-to-air kill was scored by a GBU-10 when an F-15E Strike Eagle of the 335th Tactical Fighter Squadron hit an Iraqi Air Force Mil Mi-24 Hind. 30 seconds after firing, the F-15E crew thought the bomb had missed and was about to fire an AIM-9 Sidewinder air-to-air missile when the helicopter suddenly exploded.

Both Lockheed Martin and Raytheon have developed GPS-guided versions of the GBU-10.  Lockheed Martin calls its version the DMLGB (Dual-Mode LGB) GPS/INS, and the U.S. Navy issued Lockheed Martin a contract in 2005 for further development of the weapon system.  The GPS/INS-equipped version of the GBU-10 produced by Raytheon is the GBU-50/B, also informally also known as the EGBU-10 (GPS/INS-enabled LGBs are frequently referred to as Enhanced GBUs or EGBUs). So far, Raytheon-built Paveway II EGBUs have only been produced for export, and have been used in combat by the British Royal Air Force over Afghanistan and Iraq.

References

External links

 Raytheon's official Paveway fact page
 Globalsecurity.org Paveway fact page
 Lockheed Martin Paveway fact page
 Designation-Systems.net Paveway II fact page

Guided bombs of the United States
Military equipment introduced in the 1970s